Homme was a South Korean musical duo. The duo was composed of Lee Hyun and Lee Chang-min.

Musical career

The duo consisted of 2AM member, Lee Changmin and 8Eight's Lee Hyun and formed as a project group in 2010, releasing their first digital single "I Was Able to Eat Well." The song was the signature debut project for 2010's Mnet 20's Choice Awards producer Bang Shi-hyuk (aka 'Hitman Bang'), and was listed as the second most popular by Gaon in mobile ringtone sales in 2010. On their first anniversary, in July 2011, they released it as part of an EP "HOMME," and again as part of a mini-album "Pour les femmes" in 2014. They performed the song, which won 'Best Ballad Song' at the "1st Korea Music Copyright Awards" ceremony hosted by the Korea Music Copyright Association (KOMCA) in December 2011.

"I Was Able to Eat Well" also received attention in 2011 when Korea's Youth Protection Committee (YPC) banned it for those under 19 for lyrics which included, "I’ll drink heavily with my friends to forget everything" and "Blub, blub, blub after I drank heavily yesterday." A song of Beast's was similarly censored at the same time.

Other singles they have done include "It Girl," "Man Should Laugh," and 2015's "Let's Not Cry," which preceded their October concert series "Hommexit" performed in Seoul.  Also in 2015, they released another single "Ain't No Love."

In March 2016, they performed a concert to celebrate White Day, "The Homme's Love" at Yonsei University.

On February 1, 2018, BigHit Entertainment announced that Lee Chang-min would be leaving the agency to establish his own one-man agency after his exclusive contract came to an end in January.

Discography

Extended plays

Single albums

Singles

Other charted songs

Collaborations

Soundtrack appearances

Awards and nominations

References

External links 

K-pop music groups
Musical groups established in 2011
South Korean contemporary R&B musical groups
South Korean pop music groups
South Korean musical duos
South Korean boy bands
Male musical duos
Hybe Corporation artists
2011 establishments in South Korea